Leonardo "Leo" López Jiménuez (born 15 October 1970) is a Spanish retired footballer who played as a right back, and is the current manager of FC Ascó.

External links

1970 births
Living people
Sportspeople from Tarragona
Spanish footballers
Footballers from Catalonia
Association football defenders
Segunda División B players
Tercera División players
FC Andorra players
AEC Manlleu footballers
RCD Espanyol B footballers
Palamós CF footballers
CE Sabadell FC footballers
Gimnàstic de Tarragona footballers
Spanish football managers
Segunda División managers
Lorca Deportiva CF managers
Lorca FC managers